The 1979 WTA Tour consisted of a number of tennis tournaments for female tennis players. It was composed of the newly streamlined version of the Avon Championships (which was now an 11-week tour of the US) and the Colgate Series. The year 1979 also saw the creation of the first official ranking system and these rankings were used to determine acceptance into the tournaments.

Schedule 
This is a calendar of all events which were part of either the Avon Championships circuit or the Colgate Series in the year 1979, with player progression documented from the quarterfinals stage. Also included are the Grand Slam tournaments, the 1979 Avon Championships, the 1979 Federation Cup and a number of events not affiliated with either tour.

Key

November (1978)

December (1978)

January

February

March

April

May

June

July

August

September

October

November

December

January (1980)

Rankings 
Below are the 1979 WTA year-end rankings (December 31, 1979) in both singles and doubles competition:

Colgate Series

Points system 
The tournaments of the Colgate Series were divided into four groups – AAAA, AAA, AA and A – based on prize money. Points were allocated based on these groups and the finishing position of a player in a tournament. The points allocation – with doubles points listed in brackets – was:

Avon Championships Circuit

Points standing

Prize money 
Combined prize money for singles and doubles events.

See also 
 1979 Men's Grand Prix circuit

References

External links 
 Women's Tennis Association (WTA) official website
 International Tennis Federation (ITF) official website

 
WTA Tour
WTA Tour seasons